Moritz Ludwig George Wichmann (1821–1859) was a German astronomer. He was an ardent observer of minor planets. A student of Friedrich Bessel, he observed with the famous Königsberg heliometer. In 1853 he published a determination of the parallax of Groombridge 1830.

The asteroid 7103 Wichmann and the Wichmann crater on the Moon were named in his honour.

Notes 

19th-century German astronomers
1821 births
1859 deaths